Jherson Enrique Córdoba Ospina (born 9 February 1988) is a Colombian former professional footballer who plays as a defensive midfielder. He last played for Itagüí Leones in 2018.

Career

Club 
Córdoba began his career with La Equidad in 2006 and played for them until 2010, making 94 league appearances and scoring 4 goals. He signed on loan for Envigado in March 2011. In July 2011, Córdoba moved to Argentina to play for Atlético de Rafaela. In December 2011, he signed with Atlético Nacional on a season-long loan deal. On 21 February 2012, Cordoba scored two goals in a Copa Libertadores match against Peñarol of Uruguay that finished in a 0-4 away victory.

In late December 2012, Cordoba signed for Mexican club San Luis and played for them during six months. In July 2013, he traveled back to Colombia and signed for Junior. In January 2014, he transferred to Independiente Medellín. In June 2016, he joined Sport Boys Warnes of Bolivia on a one-year-contract. On 28 April 2017, he scored a goal in a 1-3 loss against Godoy Cruz in the 2017 Copa Libertadores, despite being sent off just two minutes later.

Córdoba and the club agreed to terminate his contract in May 2017. He transferred to Itagui Leones for the 2018 season.

International 
Cordóba was called up to the Colombia national football team for the 2010 World Cup qualifying matches against Chile and Paraguay on 10 and 14 October 2009 respectively. He played in the match against Paraguay, which was his first and only match for Colombia.

References

External links

1988 births
Living people
Colombian footballers
Colombia international footballers
La Equidad footballers
Envigado F.C. players
Atlético de Rafaela footballers
Atlético Nacional footballers
San Luis F.C. players
Chiapas F.C. footballers
Categoría Primera A players
Categoría Primera B players
Argentine Primera División players
Liga MX players
Colombian expatriate footballers
Expatriate footballers in Argentina
Colombian expatriate sportspeople in Argentina
Expatriate footballers in Mexico
Colombian expatriate sportspeople in Mexico
Association football midfielders
Footballers from Bogotá